Natland is a civil parish in the South Lakeland District of Cumbria, England.  It contains 14 listed buildings that are recorded in the National Heritage List for England.  Of these, one is listed at Grade II*, the middle of the three grades, and the others are at Grade II, the lowest grade.  The parish contains the village of Natland, and is otherwise rural.  The listed buildings include houses, farmhouses, farm buildings, bridges, a church, a milestone, and a boundary post.


Key

Buildings

References

Citations

Sources

Lists of listed buildings in Cumbria